Powers Lake is the name of two reservoirs in Floyd County, in the U.S. state of Georgia.

The twin lakes are formally called Powers Lake Number One and Powers Lake Number Two. Both lakes were named for Nick Powers Jr. and Nick Powers Sr. who were the original landowners.

See also
List of lakes in Georgia (U.S. state)

References

Bodies of water of Floyd County, Georgia
Reservoirs in Georgia (U.S. state)